Ibanda University (IU) is a private, co-educational Ugandan university in the Western Region of Uganda.

Location
The campus of the university is located in Bubaare Cell, Bufunda Ward, Bufunda Division in the Municipality of Ibanda (pop.31,316), in Ibanda District, Western Uganda. The geographical coordinates of the campus of Ibanda University are:0°07'24.0"S, 30°29'54.0"E (Latitude:-0.123333; Longitude:30.498333).

Overview
The university was established in 2014 by private Ugandan individuals. It is accredited by the Uganda National Council for Higher Education. It is a co-educational institution that offers certificate, diploma and bachelors courses.

The highest supervisory body of the university is the board of trustees. Below the board is the university council. Below the council, is the university senate. The day-to-day activities of the university are supervised by the vice chancellor, assisted by the university secretary, the university bursar, the academic registrar and the deans of schools of the university. Currently the chairman of the board of trustees is "Mr. Jeeb Rwomushana", the university chancellor is Prof. Venansius Baryamureeba and the vice-chancellor is Professor Samson James Opolot. The systems administrator at Ibanda University is Mr. Gilbert Bang.

Academics

Courses offered
 Certificate courses
1. Certificate in Business Administration

 Diploma courses
1. Diploma in Public Administration 2. Diploma in Development Studies 3. Diploma in Business Administration 4. Diploma in Information Technology 5. Diploma in Primary Education

 Bachelors courses
1. Bachelor of Business Administration 2. Bachelor of Information Technology 3. Bachelor of Social Sciences 4. Bachelor of Development Studies 5. Bachelor of Primary Education

See also
Education in Uganda
List of universities in Uganda

References

External links
 Official Website

 
Western Region, Uganda
Buildings and structures in Uganda
2014 establishments in Uganda
Ankole sub-region
Educational institutions established in 2014